Montserrat competed in the 2014 Commonwealth Games in Glasgow, Scotland from 23 July to 3 August 2014. Montserrat's team consisted of four male athletes in athletics.

Athletics

Men

References

Nations at the 2014 Commonwealth Games
Montserrat at the Commonwealth Games
2014 in Montserrat